The Grand Prix Velo Erciyes is a men's and women's one-day road cycling race held in Turkey. It is rated as a 1.2 event on the UCI Europe Tour.

Winners

Men

Women

References

Cycle races in Turkey
2020 establishments in Turkey
Recurring sporting events established in 2020
UCI Europe Tour races